Lum is a surname.

Origins
As a Chinese surname, Lum may be an ad hoc spelling, based on the pronunciation in different varieties of Chinese, of the following surnames. Those surnames are listed below by their romanisation in Hanyu Pinyin, which reflects the standard Mandarin pronunciation:
Lín, spelled Lum based on its Cantonese pronunciation
Lán, spelled Lum based on its Hakka pronunciation

The English surname Lum is a variant spelling of Lumb, which originated either as a toponymic surname referring to Lumb in Lancashire, or from the Middle English word  ("pool").

Statistics
Statistics compiled by Patrick Hanks on the basis of the 2011 United Kingdom census and the Census of Ireland 2011 found 190 people with the surname Lum on the island of Great Britain and one on the island of Ireland. In the 1881 United Kingdom census there were 76 bearers of the surname, primarily at West Yorkshire. The 2010 United States census found 8,060 people with the surname Lum, making it the 4,406th-most-common surname in the country. This was roughly the same number of people as in the 2000 census (8,044 people; 4,042nd-most-common). In the 2010 census, roughly 17% of the bearers of the surname identified as non-Hispanic white, while the number identifying as Asian decreased from 68% in the 2000 census to 62% in the 2010 census.

People

Arts and entertainment
 Bertha Lum (1869–1954), American artist
 Wayne Lum (1943–2006), Canadian sculptor of Chinese descent
 Wing Tek Lum (born 1945), American poet
 Mary Lum (artist) (born 1951), American artist
 Agnes Lum (born 1956), American bikini model of Chinese and Hawaiian descent
 Ken Lum (born 1956), Canadian professor of fine arts
 Awkwafina (Nora Lum ; born 1988), American actress and comedian
 Debbie Lum, American documentary filmmaker of Chinese descent
 Zachary Alakaʻi Lum (born 1992), American musician from Hawaii
 Peter Lum, Malaysian fashion stylist

Sport
 Lum Pao-Hua (1906–1965), Australian-born tennis player who later represented China
 Mike Lum (born 1945), American baseball player 
 Sabrina Lum (born 1971), swimmer who represented Chinese Taipei at the 1988 Summer Olympics
 Kristina Lum (born 1976), American synchronized swimmer
 Erin Lum (born 1977), American judo athlete from Guam
 Jared Lum (born 1992), Australian footballer based in Hong Kong
 Leah Lum (born 1996), Canadian ice hockey forward

Other
 Mary Lum (1758–1815), wife of American banker Stephen Girard
 Dyer Lum (1839–1893), American anarchist and labor activist 
 C. E. Lum (1852–1941), American politician
 Walter U. Lum (1882–1961), American newspaper editor and civil rights activist
 Emma Ping Lum (1910–1989), first American woman lawyer of Chinese descent, daughter of Walter U. Lum
 Olivia Lum (born 1962), Singaporean water treatment systems businesswoman

References

English-language surnames
Multiple Chinese surnames